Melaka Sentral is the largest public transportation terminal in Malacca, Malaysia. It occupies 46.6 hectares of land and located between Lebuh AMJ (Jalan Tun Abdul Razak) and Jalan Panglima Awang and was opened on 14 May 2004. The construction of the bus terminal, costed RM 610, 000, began in February 2003 and completed in the following year. It was constructed with high roofs which allows sunlight to reach the inside of the terminal building and based on the design of Kuala Lumpur International Airport (KLIA). The bus terminal is linked to Lotus's Peringgit and Seri Cempaka retail area by an octobus linkbridge.

See also
 Transport in Malaysia

References

External links

 

2004 establishments in Malaysia
Buildings and structures in Malacca
Bus stations in Malaysia
Central Melaka District
Transport in Malacca